= Diving at the 2010 South American Games – Women's 10 m synchro platform =

The Women's 19m Synchronized Platform event at the 2010 South American Games was held on March 23 at 13:00.

== Medalists ==
Gold	Silver	Bronze
Sara Lizeth Castaño; Carolina Urrea; Colombia	Nicoli Cruz; Milena Sae; Brazil	Gabriela Gutierrez; Rafaela Ramos; Ecuador

== Results ==
Rank	Athlete	Dives					Result
Rank	Athlete	1	2	3	4	5	Result
1st place, gold medalist(s)	Colombia; Sara Lizeth Castaño; Carolina Urrea	45.60	43.80	56.16	61.38	44.88	251.82
2nd place, silver medalist(s)	Brazil; Nicoli Cruz; Milena Sae	42.00	45.00	61.32	46.11	49.59	244.02
3rd place, bronze medalist(s)	Ecuador; Gabriela Gutierrez; Rafaela Ramos	48.00	40.80	48.96	50.22	40.71	228.69
